Collinsville is an unincorporated community in DeKalb County, in the U.S. state of Georgia.

History
The Georgia General Assembly incorporated the place in 1887 as the "Town of Collinsville". It is unknown why the name "Collinsville" was applied to this community.

References

Unincorporated communities in DeKalb County, Georgia